Katarzyna "Kasia" Selwant is the former Polish national curling team lead.  In 2005, she posed for a calendar to promote women's curling. She played in both the 2004 and 2005 European Curling Championships for skip Krystyna Beniger. Poland finished 17th and 21st respectively.

See also
 Ana Arce
 Daniela Jentsch
 Melanie Robillard
 Lynsay Ryan
 Claudia Toth

External links
 Ana Acre Team Sponsorship Calendar 2006
 The Curling News
 Curling calendar creating stir
 https://web.archive.org/web/20051105091326/http://www.mojoradio.ca/news/news.cfm?dir=sports&file=s103145A&n=2
 Calendar to provide funds for players in European nations
 Women of curling gain greater exposure

Polish female curlers
Living people
Year of birth missing (living people)
Place of birth missing (living people)